The Accademia degli Umoristi (Academy of the Humorists) was a learned society of  intellectuals, mainly noblemen, that significantly influenced the cultural life of 17th century Rome. It was briefly revived in the first half of the eighteenth century by Pope Clement XI.

History 
The Accademia degli Umoristi, together with the Academy of Arcadia and the ephemeral Academy of the "Notti Vaticane", or "Vatican Nights", founded by St. Charles Borromeo, was one of the main Roman literary academies of the seventeenth century. The society was founded in 1603 by Paolo Mancini and Gaspare Salviani. It began as place for writers and intellectuals to celebrate burlesque and mock-heroic poetry, but soon attracted some of the most prominent literary figures and patrons of the arts in Rome. Thanks to the support and protection that it obtained from Cardinal Francesco Barberini, it became a semi-official institution. Like all the academies of the XV-XVI-XVII centuries, the Accademia degli Umoristi was chaired (or governed) by a Prince, who organized the sessions, directed the work, represented it in other Academies or before the authorities. The office had an annual duration, but could be repeated. The Princes of the Accademia degli Umoristi were among the most prestigious and innovative writers of late Renaissance and early Baroque Italy: Giovanni Battista Guarini (1611), Alessandro Tassoni (1606-1607), Giambattista Marino (1623). The laws of the Accademia degli Umoristi also allowed for limited female participation. "Feminis primariis ætate et forma prestantibus earumque viris eam frequentandi veniam dabant leges". The Naples-born writer Margherita Sarrocchi was the first woman to be a regular member of the academy. The Coat of arms of the Academy was born on the insistence of Giovanni Battista Guarini (then Prince of the Academy) in 1611: there were numerous proposals and finally what became definitive was accepted: a cloud from which rain falls on the waves of the sea and below towards Lucretian motto «Redit Agmine Dulci» (Returns from the battlefield to sweetness). The academy became defunct around 1670. In 1717 Pope Clement XI wanted to restore it and appointed Alessandro Albani as prince, not yet a cardinal. However, the attempt was unsuccessful and shortly thereafter the Academy finally disappeared.

Members

   Alexander VII
   Alessandro Albani
   Girolamo Aleandro
   Tommaso Aversa
   Sigismondo Boldoni
   Baldassarre Bonifacio
   Francesco Bracciolini
   Antonio Bruni
   Giovanni Francesco Busenello
   Jacopo Cicognini
   Clement VIII
   Clement XI
   Cassiano dal Pozzo
   Pietro Della Valle
   Francesco Della Valle
   Giovanni Battista Doni
   Nicolas-Claude Fabri de Peiresc
   Porfirio Feliciano
   Paganino Gaudenzi
   Vincenzo Gramigna
   Giovanni Battista Guarini
   Pierre Hévin
   Lucas Holstenius
   Giulio Mancini
   Paolo Mancini
   Prospero Mandosio
   Giovanni Battista Manna
   Giovanni Battista Marino
   Agostino Mascardi
   Gabriel Naudé
   Pietro Sforza Pallavicino
   Girolamo Preti
   Antonio Querenghi
   Gian Vittorio Rossi
   Margherita Sarrocchi
   Agazio di Somma
   Alessandro Tassoni
   Bartolommeo Tortoletti
   Vincent Voiture

References

External links 
 

Learned societies of Italy
1603 establishments in Italy
Organisations based in Rome